Chikjajur is a town in Karnataka. The town is served by a railway line. Chikjajur later emerged as the market centre for surrounding regions there.

The town is known for the 500-year-old Temple of Lord Maruthi.

See also
Hagalavadi
Gubbi
Bukkapatna
Hosdurga
Holalkere
Huliyar
Tumkur
Davanagere

References 

Cities and towns in Chitradurga district